Devyne Fabian Jairo Rensch (born 18 January 2003) is a Dutch professional footballer who plays as a full-back for Eredivisie club Ajax and the Netherlands national team.

Club career

Ajax
Rensch played in the youth academies of VV Unicum and Ajax. In the 2020–21 pre-season, Rensch, who had not yet made an appearance for Jong Ajax at that time, was given several minutes of play in Ajax's first team. During the regular season he was officially part of the first team, but he played most of his matches for Jong Ajax. On 19 November 2020, he was awarded the Abdelhak Nouri trophy as the best talent of Ajax's youth academy in the 2019–20 season. He succeeded Naci Ünüvar, who received the prize a year earlier. Rensch made his debut for Ajax's first team on 28 November 2020, in an Eredivisie match against Emmen. He made his first start on 31 January 2021. On 18 February, he made his European debut in the UEFA Europa League against Lille OSC. He scored his first goal for Ajax on 21 March in a 5–0 home win over ADO Den Haag. In the course of the season he received more and more playing time as a right back, partly due to injuries to other players, and he featured as a starter for Ajax in the second half of the season. On 18 April 2021, he won his first silverware with Ajax by beating Vitesse in the KNVB Cup final. After that, the Eredivisie title was also won.

Rensch played less during the 2021–22 season, losing his starting spot to Noussair Mazraoui. Before the start of the 2022–23 season, Rensch expressed his wish of playing a more decisive role after struggling to find his form in the previous season, and after the departure of fellow right-back Mazraoui. However, Ajax also brought in Jorge Sánchez for the position. After the start of the season, Rensch regained his form and became the starter.

International career
Born in the Netherlands, Rensch is of Surinamese descent. He was a youth international for the Netherlands.

He made his debut for the Netherlands national football team on 7 September 2021 in a World Cup qualifier against Turkey, a 6–1 home victory. He substituted Denzel Dumfries in the 71st minute.

Career statistics

Club

Honours
Ajax
 Eredivisie: 2020–21, 2021–22
 KNVB Cup: 2020–21

Netherlands U17
UEFA European Under-17 Championship: 2019

Individual
 Abdelhak Nouri Trophy: 2019–20

References

External links
Profile at the AFC Ajax website
Career stats - Voetbal International

2003 births
Living people
Footballers from Lelystad
Dutch footballers
Netherlands international footballers
Netherlands under-21 international footballers
Netherlands youth international footballers
Association football defenders
AFC Ajax players
Jong Ajax players
Eerste Divisie players
Eredivisie players
Dutch sportspeople of Surinamese descent